Lists of humanoids cover humanoids, imaginary species similar to humans. They are organized by type (avian, piscine and amphibian, reptilian, and extraterrestrial), and by medium (literature, comics, animation, television, film and video games).

By type

List of avian humanoids
List of piscine and amphibian humanoids
List of reptilian humanoids
List of humanoid aliens
Little people (mythology)

By medium

List of fictional humanoid species in literature
List of fictional humanoid species in comics
List of fictional humanoid species in television
List of fictional humanoid species in film
List of fictional humanoid species in video games